Frank Blum (born May 3, 1952) is a Canadian former professional ice hockey goaltender. He was selected by the Atlanta Flames in the tenth round (82nd overall) of the 1972 NHL Amateur Draft.

Between 1972 and 1974, Blum played 9 regular season and playoff games in the World Hockey Association with the Ottawa Nationals, Toronto Toros, and Winnipeg Jets.

References

External links

1952 births
Living people
Atlanta Flames draft picks
Canadian ice hockey goaltenders
Clinton Comets players
Ice hockey people from Ontario
Sportspeople from Greater Sudbury
Mohawk Valley Comets players
Ottawa Nationals players
Port Huron Flags players
Toronto Toros players
Winnipeg Jets (WHA) players
Canadian expatriate ice hockey players in the United States